Judge Hastings may refer to:

Alcee Hastings (1936–2021), judge of the United States District Court for the Southern District of Florida
John Simpson Hastings (1898–1977), judge of the United States Court of Appeals for the Seventh Circuit

See also
Justice Hastings (disambiguation)